The Kiautschou German pidgin is a minor extinct pidgin spoken by German-educated Chinese in the Kiautschou Bay concession.

Background 
There are records of some sort of a German pidgin developing since 1898. However, despite the high number of Germans within the concession, due to trade reasons, many preferred to use English instead. Thus, vigorous promotion of education of the German language commenced, and a slow transition from English to German began in the concession.

Sample sentences 
The German pidgin never fully developed on its own, instead branching off of the pre-existing English pidgin. Though not extensively recorded, it can be inferred many different local variations exist.

The following are samples of the pidgin:

References 

German-based pidgins and creoles
Extinct languages of Asia
Chinese-based pidgins and creoles
Languages attested from the 20th century
Languages extinct in the 20th century